Þorsteinn Bjarnason  (born 22 March 1957) is an Icelandic former professional footballer who played as a goalkeeper.

Club career
Bjarnason played most of his career for ÍBK Keflavík and had a brief spell in the Belgian League with R.A.A. Louviéroise.

International career
He made his debut for Iceland in 1978 and went on to win 28 caps.

References

External links

1957 births
Living people
Thorsteinn Bjarnason
Thorsteinn Bjarnason
Thorsteinn Bjarnason
R.A.A. Louviéroise players
Expatriate footballers in Belgium
Association football goalkeepers
Thorsteinn Bjarnason